Miss Indian America was a pageant from 1953 to 1989 that was part annual All-American Indian Days festival in Sheridan, Wyoming. Each contestant was assessed on the basis of her appearance, communication skills, knowledge and practice of her culture, knowledge of tribal, federal and state governments and talent in traditional and contemporary tribal skills.

The reigning Miss Indian American was considered to be a cultural ambassador between Native Americans and non-Native Americans through speaking engagements, public appearances, participation in conferences of federal, state, local and tribal governments.

In 2017, Montana: The Magazine of Western History published a full history of the pageant.

Winners

References

1953 establishments in Wyoming
American awards
Beauty pageants for people of specific ethnic or national descents
Beauty pageants in the United States
Native American culture
Native American history of Wyoming
20th-century Native American women
20th-century Native Americans
Wyoming culture
Sheridan, Wyoming